Medical District High School (MDHS) is a public high school in Memphis, Tennessee. It is a part of Memphis-Shelby County Schools.

It is located on the property of Southwest Tennessee Community College, located in Building E.

The school opened in 2021.

Kesha Ivy became the school's first principal.

Students at MDHS are permitted to take community college courses and may, during their studies, pursue associates degrees in allied health and in information technology.

References

External links
 Medical District High School

Public high schools in Tennessee
Educational institutions established in 2021
2021 establishments in Tennessee
Schools in Memphis, Tennessee